Syzygium andamanicum is a species of plant in the family Myrtaceae. It is endemic to the Andaman Islands.  It is threatened by habitat loss.

References

andamanicum
Flora of the Andaman Islands
Critically endangered plants
Taxonomy articles created by Polbot